The 2022–23 Munster Rugby season is Munster's twenty-second season competing in the United Rugby Championship, alongside which they are also competing in the European Rugby Champions Cup. It is Graham Rowntree's first season as head coach following his promotion.

Events
Head coach Johann van Graan, who joined Munster in November 2017, confirmed in December 2021 that he would be leaving the province at the end of the 2021–22 season to join English club Bath. In addition to this, senior coach Stephen Larkham also left the province to return home to Australia to become head coach of the Brumbies, and defence coach JP Ferreira followed van Graan to join Bath. However, forwards coach Graham Rowntree extended his stay with the province by a further two years, and the province confirmed in April 2022 that Rowntree would be promoted to head coach from the 2022–23 season. Mike Prendergast, a former scrum-half for the province, joined Rowntree's coaching setup as the attack coach on a three-year contract, having most recently fulfilled a similar role for French club Racing 92. Andi Kyriacou, who had joined the province in April 2021 as an elite player development officer with the academy, was promoted to forwards coach with the senior squad on a two-year contract, and former Munster player Denis Leamy returned to the province as defence coach on a three-year contract. Three additions were also made to the academy staff, with former players Brendan O'Connor and Tommy O'Donnell joining as elite player development officers and Matt Brown joining as pathway development coach.

In player news, Munster's marquee signing ahead of the commencement of the season was centre Malakai Fekitoa, who won the 2015 Rugby World Cup with New Zealand before reverting his international allegiance to his native Tonga. Irish-qualified hooker Chris Moore joined from Exeter University, and five players were promoted from the academy to the senior squad: hooker Scott Buckley, lock Paddy Kelly, back-rower Alex Kendellen, lock Eoin O'Connor, and scrum-half Paddy Patterson. Centre Antoine Frisch, who is Irish-qualified, also joined the province from English club Bristol Bears. Six players joined year one of Munster's academy programme ahead of the season: props Darragh McSweeney and Kieran Ryan, lock Evan O'Connell, back-row Ruadhán Quinn, scrum-half Jack Oliver and centre Fionn Gibbons.

Hooker Declan Moore left the province to join Ulster on a permanent basis, having spent time on loan at the northern province during the previous season. Fly-half Jake Flannery joined Moore in moving north to Ulster, whilst lock Jason Jenkins moved east to join Leinster after an injury-disrupted season at Munster, and fullback Matt Gallagher and flanker Chris Cloete joined former head coach Johann van Graan at Bath. Veteran prop John Ryan left to join English club Wasps, and hooker Kevin O'Byrne joined English RFU Championship club Ealing Trailfinders. Centre Alex McHenry and back-three Seán French left the province to join English Championship clubs Jersey Reds and Bedford Blues respectively, whilst scrum-half Rowan Osborne and academy back-three Jonathan Wren were both forced to retire due to injury, and South African world cup-winning centre Damian de Allende returned to Japanese domestic rugby with Saitama Wild Knights. Centre Chris Farrell was released from his contract with the province in early March 2023 to join French club Oyonnax, with prop James French also being released by the province in March 2023 to pursue a new playing opportunity.

Munster were drawn in pool B for the 2022–23 European Rugby Champions Cup and faced French club Toulouse, who have when the competition a record five times and have knocked Munster out of tournament in the previous two seasons, and English club Northampton Saints, who beat Munster in the 2000 Heineken Cup Final and last faced the province during the 2011–12 Heineken Cup pool stage.

Munster began pre-season with a 28–19 defeat at home to English club Gloucester on 26 August 2022. The following day, after the GAA Central Council unanimously backed the proposal, Munster confirmed they would face a South Africa XV in a friendly held at Cork GAA's 45,000-capacity Páirc Uí Chaoimh on 10 November 2022. It would be the first time Munster have faced a South African national team in the professional era - their last such meeting was in 1970 - and would also see former Munster coaches Rassie Erasmus and Jacques Nienaber return to the province for the first time since their departure in 2017. Munster's second and final pre-season fixture was a 19–14 defeat to London Irish on 2 September 2022.

Munster opened their 2022–23 United Rugby Championship season with a 20–13 defeat away to Cardiff on 17 September 2022. Cardiff lead 12–6 at half-time, with Ben Healy scoring Munster's points from two penalties, before a 62nd minute try from Jack O'Sullivan, converted by Jack Crowley, gave Munster a 13–12 lead. Cardiff's lead was restored by a 68th minute penalty from Jarrod Evans and Aled Summerhill's 77th minute try sealed the home sides win. New signings Malakai Fekitoa and Antoine Frisch made their competitive debuts for the province in the fixture.

After a mounting number of injuries sustained prior to round seven of the United Rugby Championship, prop John Ryan returned to the province to provide tighthead prop cover on a three-month contract, having been made redundant following Wasps administration, Irish-qualified centre Oli Morris joined for the remainder of the season following Worcester Warriors administration, and lock Kiran McDonald joined on a three-month contract having also been made redundant at Wasps. After finishing his contract at the end of January 2023, Ryan will move to New Zealand to join Super Rugby team the Chiefs.

Munster's historic friendly against a South Africa XV went ahead on 10 November 2022. The match was a 41,400 sell-out at Páirc Uí Chaoimh, making it the largest attendance for a rugby match in the province, and saw Munster secure their first ever win against South Africa in a 28–14 victory. Winger Shane Daly opened the scoring in just the 2nd minute, with fly-half Ben Healy converting to give the home side a 7–0 lead. South Africa hit back in the 12th minute through an Aphelele Fassi try that was converted by Johan Goosen to level the score, but Munster struck back with tries from Simon Zebo and Diarmuid Barron, both converted by Healy, to head into half-time with a 21–7. Munster struck early in the second-half, with fullback Mike Haley scoring after just two minutes and Healy's fourth conversion of the night extending their lead to 28–7. South Africa scored their second try in the 62nd minute when Sikhumbuzo Notshe crossed the try-line, converted by Gianni Lombard, but the visitors were unable to mount a comeback and Munster hung on to earn a famous win.

Munster opened their 2022–23 Champions Cup campaign with an 18–13 defeat at home to French club Toulouse on 11 December 2022. Munster took the lead in the 9th minute through a Joey Carbery try (Munster's 500th in European competitive rugby), which the fly-half also converted, before Toulouse responded with a Matthis Lebel try in the 22nd minute, converted by Thomas Ramos, before a penalty from Ramos in the 29th minute extended the visitors lead, though a Carbery penalty in the 38th minute saw the teams level at 10–10 at half-time. Toulouse struck almost immediately in the second-half, with replacement Lucas Tauzin scoring a try in the 42nd minute. Ramos missed the conversion but scored a 71st minute penalty to extend Toulouse's lead to eight points, but a second successful penalty from Carbery in the 74th minute brought Munster back to within losing bonus-point range, but the province was unable to take advantage of an Antoine Dupont yellow card in the final minutes of the game.

A huge defensive effort secured a 17–6 away win against Northampton Saints in round two of the Champions Cup on 18 December 2022. Number eight Gavin Coombes opened the scoring for Munster with a 13th minute try converted by fly-half Joey Carbery, before the home side got on the scoreboard with a 19th minute penalty. Carbery scored a penalty of his own in the 26th minute, though Northampton hit back with their second penalty just two minutes later. Coombes crossed for his and Munster's second try in the 35th minute, again converted by Carbery, to leave the score at 17–6 at half-time. Munster had three players sin-binned during the second-half: Jack O'Donoghue, Craig Casey and Joey Carbery, and needed the aforementioned defensive effort to keep Northampton from narrowing the score and earn a hard-fought victory on the road.

In the reverse fixture against Northampton Saints on 14 January 2023, Munster raced to a 24–0 half-time lead thanks to two tries from Gavin Coombes and one try from Jack O'Donoghue, all converted by Joey Carbery, who also added one penalty, though O'Donoghue was sent-off for a high tackle during the half. What looked like a comfortable victory turned into a tense finish however, when Northampton mounted a comeback during the second-half, scoring 20 unanswered points to come within a try of winning the game themselves, but a 75th minute penalty from Jack Crowley and some last-gasp defence secured the victory for Munster.

Munster's fourth and final Champions Cup pool stage fixture was away to Toulouse on 22 January 2023. The French club dominated possession and territory during the opening quarter of the match and were 11–0 ahead before Munster grew into the game. Flanker John Hodnett got Munster on the scoreboard with an unconverted 30th minute try, before a penalty from fly-half Joey Carbery saw the teams head into half-time with the score at 11–8. A superb team try finished by lock Tadhg Beirne in the 48th minute, again unconverted, gave Munster a slender 13–11 lead, but three second-half penalties from Toulouse fullback Melvyn Jaminet secured a closely-fought 20–16 win for the hosts. This result and others meant that Munster will face an away trip to South African side the Sharks in the last 16.

Player movements
Below are the players who joined and left the Munster senior and academy squads ahead of the 2022–23 season. Italics indicates players that transferred during the 2022–23 season.

Senior squad

Players in
 Scott Buckley promoted from Academy
 Alex Kendellen promoted from Academy
 Malakai Fekitoa from  Wasps
 Paddy Kelly promoted from Academy
 Chris Moore from  Exeter University
 Eoin O'Connor promoted from Academy
 Paddy Patterson promoted from Academy
 Antoine Frisch from  Bristol Bears
 Oli Morris from  Worcester Warriors (short-term contract)
 John Ryan from  Wasps (short-term contract)
 Kiran McDonald from  Wasps (short-term contract)

Players out
 Declan Moore to  Ulster
 Jason Jenkins to  Leinster
 Matt Gallagher to  Bath
 Jake Flannery to  Ulster
 Chris Cloete to  Bath
 John Ryan to  Wasps
 Kevin O'Byrne to  Ealing
 Rowan Osborne retired
 Seán French to  Bedford Blues
 Alex McHenry to  Jersey Reds
 Damian de Allende to  Saitama Wild Knights
 John Ryan to  Chiefs
 Chris Farrell to  Oyonnax James French releasedAcademy squad

Players in
 Fionn Gibbons
 Darragh McSweeney
 Evan O'Connell
 Jack Oliver
 Ruadhán Quinn
 Kieran Ryan

Players out
 Jonathan Wren retiredCoaches and staff
Senior squad

Academy squad

Players

Senior squad

Academy squad

Pre-season

Friendly

2022–23 United Rugby Championship

Round 1

Round 2

Round 3

Round 4

Round 5

Round 6

Round 7

Round 8

Round 9

Round 10

Round 11

Round 12

Round 13

Round 14

Round 15

Round 16

Round 17

Round 18

2022–23 European Rugby Champions Cup

Following their sixth-placed finish in the 2021–22 United Rugby Championship, Munster were seeded in tier three for the 2022–23 European Rugby Champions Cup. The province was drawn in pool B and will face French club Toulouse and English club Northampton Saints.

Round 1

Round 2

Round 3

Round 4

Last 16

2022–23 Munster A/Development season
Friendlies

Player statistics
Player statistics from the 2022–23 season. Stats from the league and European competitions only are shown. Academy players in italics. Updated 13 March 2023 after URC round 15''

References

Notes

External links
Official Munster website
URC Munster
EPCR Munster

2022-23
2022–23 in Irish rugby union
2022–23 United Rugby Championship by team
2022–23 European Rugby Champions Cup by team